Slave was an American Ohio-based funk band popular in the late 1970s and early 1980s.  Trumpeter and multi-instrumentalist Steve Washington, born in New Jersey, attended East Orange High School, and was one of the first users of the "electric trumpet". He and Trombonist Floyd Miller formed the group in Dayton, Ohio, in 1975.

Career
During late 1975 and spring of 1976, trombonist Floyd Miller teamed with trumpeter Steve Washington to form Slave. The original line-up included Tom Lockett Jr. (tenor and alto sax), Carter Bradley (keyboards), Mark Adams (bass), Mark "Drac" Hicks (lead and rhythm guitar, background vocals), Danny Webster (rhythm and lead guitar, lead and background vocals), Orion "Bimmy" Wilhoite (alto and tenor sax), and Tim "Tiny" Dozier (drums). They scored their first big hit with the single "Slide" in 1977 for Cotillion Records, which is the label they remained with until 1984. In 1978 Slave's sound changed slightly when drummer/percussionist Steve Arrington, along with vocalists Starleana Young, Curt Jones, and keyboardist Ray Turner joined the band. Arrington ultimately replaced Miller and Webster as lead vocalist.

Other top ten R&B hits were "Just a Touch of Love" in 1979, "Watching You" in 1980, and "Snap Shot" in 1981. They added Charles Carter on sax and brother Sam Carter on keyboards. Starleana Young, Steve Washington, Curt Jones and Lockett departed to form Aurra in 1981. Slave added Roger Parker, Delbert Taylor, Jr., and Kevin Johnson as replacements. Arrington left in 1982 after the Showtime album to start his own band Steve Arrington's Hall of Fame in which Charles and Sam Carter would also play. The band continued on, though not as successfully, into the mid 1990s.

The group moved to Atlantic Records for one LP (New Plateau) in 1984, then switched to the Atlanta-based Ichiban Records the following year, releasing Unchained at Last in late 1985. Despite scoring a couple of minor hits on the R&B chart from this album the following year and another minor hit from their 1987 follow-up album, Make Believe, Slave could not recapture the commercial success they had enjoyed in their heyday. Rhino issued Stellar Fungk: The Best of Slave Featuring Steve Arrington, an anthology of their finest cuts, in 1994.

Deaths
Bass player Mark Leslie Adams Sr., a native of Dayton, died on March 5, 2011, at age 51 in Columbus, Ohio.

Guitar player Mark ("Drac") Hicks, a native of Dayton, died on June 14, 2011, at the age of 52 in Dayton, Ohio.

Singer and guitarist Danny Webster, a native of Dayton, died on September 10, 2020, at the age of 61 in Dayton, Ohio.

Discography

Studio albums

Compilation albums

Singles

References

External links
Slave at Discogs
Slave at Soulwalking
Slave Legacy, LLC at Slave Legacy, LLC

American soul musical groups
American boogie musicians
Atlantic Records artists
Atco Records artists
Cotillion Records artists
Funk musical groups from Dayton, Ohio